Carla Williams may refer to:

 Carla Marie Williams, British songwriter, producer and singer
 Carla Williams (netball)  
 Carla Williams, fictional character in the miniseries 10.5
 Carla Williams (athletic director), Virginia Cavaliers athletic director